Polka dot paint is a paint of "polka dot color", i.e., a paint which paints an object with a polka dot pattern. 

The paint is traditionally the subject of a fool's errand prank played upon apprentices in the decoration or construction trade, who are sent to fetch a bucket of polka-dot paint. A polka-dot paint effect has been produced in stage magic, and in the 1950s a polychromatic paint was invented which produced a dotted effect when dry.

Magic tricks

In the United States several magicians invented a trick in which they demonstrated painting with polka-dot paint. It was even a subject of litigation between two stage magicians, Harry Albacker and Paul Stadelman in 1950s. The defendant's defense was that the magic act is "old as hills", and hence in public domain. Stadelman, in his turn was challenged by other magicians who claimed that he pinched the idea from the "Barber's pole paint" trick. However Stadelman claimed it was actually he who invented the barber's pole paint in the first place. The idea of both tricks is simple: the object is pre-painted in the desired pattern with oil-based paint and then covered with white watercolor or whitewash. During the trick the top watercolor is removed with a wet brush (and much magic, of course). Stadelman said that often after he performed this trick at paint dealers' conventions, he was getting letters from people who wanted to market this paint. Another version involves colorless chemicals on the object which become colored after a reaction with another chemical on the brush.

Real paint
In 1950 a product called "Plextone" by Maas & Walsdtein Co. was advertised, a finishing which is a single application produced  "a network of interlaced but separate colors - a 'Polka Dot' paint". In 1952 a John C. Zola patented (US 3811904 ) polychromatic paint, technically described as "a multicolor paint from lacquer-based colorants suspended in water". The inventor was inspired by French painter Georges Seurat, who created his impressionist effects using small dots of paint. Sapolin Paints, Inc. of New York City  sold "polka-dot paint" in a spray can, which sprayed droplets of paint; the farther the can was from the surface the smaller were the dots.

In popular culture
In The Vanishing Private cartoon (1942), private Donald Duck tries to camouflage a cannon by painting it with red, green and yellow stripes, and black polka dots, from a single bucket.
Polka-dot nail polish and marker pens incorporate glitter or non-glitter colored particles to do the trick.
One can create polka-dot brushes for various computer graphics software, such as Photoshop, GIMP, etc.

References

Dot patterns
Magic tricks
Paints
Practical jokes